The 2016–17 St. John's Red Storm women's basketball team represented St. John's University during the 2016–17 NCAA Division I women's basketball season. The Red Storm, led by fifth-year head coach Joe Tartamella, played their games at Carnesecca Arena and were members of the Big East Conference. They finished the season 22–12, 11–7 in Big East play to finish in a tie for fourth place. They advanced to the semifinals of the Big East women's basketball tournament where they lost to DePaul. They were invited to the Women's National Invitation Tournament where they defeated Sacred Heart and Harvard in the first and second rounds, before losing Michigan in the third round.

Roster

Schedule

|-
!colspan=9 style="background:#BA0C2F; color:#FFFFFF;"| Non-conference regular season

|-
!colspan=9 style="background:#BA0C2F; color:#FFFFFF;"| Big East regular season

|-
!colspan=9 style="background:#BA0C2F;"| Big East Women's Tournament

|-
!colspan=9 style="background:#BA0C2F;"| WNIT

Rankings
2016–17 NCAA Division I women's basketball rankings

See also
 2016–17 St. John's Red Storm men's basketball team

References

Saint John's
St. John's Red Storm women's basketball seasons
Saint John's
Saint John's
2017 Women's National Invitation Tournament participants